is a Japanese novel series written by Tow Ubukata. The first novel was published in Japan in May 2003, with the final novel published in July 2003. They were later adapted into a manga series and an anime film trilogy. In North America, Viz Media licensed the novels and published all three in one volume. Kodansha USA published the manga series in English, and Sentai Filmworks released anime films on DVD and Blu-ray Disc.

The story is about a girl named Rune Balot who was taken in by a man named Shell who later tried to kill her and left her for dead. She is saved and turned into a cyborg. It is up to her to stop Shell and his evil gang.

In 2003, Mardock Scramble won the Grand Prize of the 24th Nihon SF Taisho Award.

Plot
Taking place in a futuristic city called Mardock City, Rune Balot is a former prostitute turned vigilante who was taken in by the notorious gambler Shell Septinos. One night, Shell abandons Rune and attempts to murder her in an explosion. However, she is rescued and transformed into a cyborg by Dr. Easter under regulation Mardock Scramble 09, an emergency ordinance where experimental technologies can be used to preserve life. An Artificial intelligence who takes the form of a mouse accompanies her to adapt to her new life. Rune is trained to use the advanced technology fitted on her to defend herself against Shell's attempts to have her killed to stop her from testifying against him.

Characters

A prostitute who becomes a pawn to the notorious gambler Shell Septinos who then tries to kill her. She is retrieved and changed into a cyborg by Dr. Easter under regulation Mardock Scramble 09. Rune is trained to use the advanced technology embedded within her and the AI construct Œufcoque to assist in Dr. Easter’s murder investigation into Shell. She uses these technologies to defend herself against the assassination attempts by the Bandersnatch group and Boiled, and take her revenge against the man who tried to terminate her.

An artificial Intelligence multidimensional construct that can transform into any object or weapon, but mostly appears as a small male mouse. He was created to assist Mardock Scramble 09 case officers and is allowed to live as long as he maintains his usefulness.

A Freelance 09 Case Officer who saves Rune Balot and turns her into a cyborg. He gives her Œufcoque to pursue his court case against Shell Septinos.

The manager of the Eggnog Blue casino and funded by the October Corporation. He murders women whose bodies he then has transformed into blue diamonds which he wears as rings. The first woman he killed was his mother who sexually molested him as a child. To avoid dealing with his guilt, he has his memories removed and stored as digital data. He is on trial for these murders and hires the Bandersnatch group and then Boiled to kill Balot and stop her from testifying against him in court. Shell is also engaged to Octavia October, Cleanwill’s beautiful but idiotic daughter.

A Freelance 09 Case Officer who used to be Œufcoque’s partner and wants to retrieve the construct from Dr. Easter and Balot. He is also hired by Shell to kill Balot.

The Leader of the Bandersnatch group of assassins and has a vagina grafted onto his hand. The group deals in human body parts and use the discarded parts themselves, or eat them if otherwise unneeded.

A member of the Bandersnatch group who collects fingers and wears them as a necklace around his neck.

A member of the Bandersnatch group who collects hair and skin.

A strongman in the Bandersnatch group who collects eyes and has them transplanted into his body.

A hacker in the Bandersnatch group who has breasts transplanted onto his body.

A human cyborg created and living within the Paradise created by three scientists but it is now taken over by the government.

A dolphin and Tweedledee’s lover in Paradise.

A Disembodied Head Administrator at the Paradise facility who lost the rest of his body to cancer.

The owner and company director of the Eggnog Blue casino, Shell Septinos’s business partner and father of Octavia October. It is also revealed that John is a paedophile (an adult who has sexual feelings for children). He makes his first appearance in Mardock Scramble: The Second Combustion.

 
The beautiful but idiotic daughter of Cleanwill John October and the fiancée of Shell Septinos. She makes her first appearance in Mardock Scramble: The Second Combustion.

A spinner at the roulette table in the Eggnog Blue casino. She is fired for losing to Rune Balot.

The manager of the Eggnog Blue casino who takes over from Marlowe John Fever after firing him for losing to Rune Balot.

A Blackjack dealer at the Eggnog Blue casino. He is fired for losing to Rune Balot.

Media

Novel
The story was written by Tow Ubukata, and illustrated by Katsuya Terada was serialized in Hayakawa's SF Magazine. The first novel was published in May 2003, and the final novel was published in July 2003. A prequel, Mardock Velocity, was released in three volumes in November 2006. Another volume titled Mardock Fragments was released on May 10, 2011. A sequel titled Mardock Anonymous was released on March 24, 2016. Viz Media licensed the original novels in English and published all three in one volume on January 18, 2011.

Manga
A manga adaptation illustrated by Yoshitoki Ōima was published in Kodansha's Bessatsu Shōnen Magazine between October 9, 2009 and May 9, 2012, compiled in seven volumes. The first volume was released in Japan on March 17, 2010, and the last on June 9, 2012. Kodansha USA published the manga in English, the first volume was released on August 23, 2011, while the last one was released on May 21, 2013. A two-volume spinoff titled Mardock Demons and illustrated by Minamoto Katasuke was published in the NEMESIS magazine from 2016 to 2018.

Cancelled anime OVAs
An OVA anime series was announced by Gonzo in 2005 which would have been directed by Yasufumi Soejima and produced by Geneon, screenplay written by Ubukata himself and character designs by Range Murata (Blue Submarine No. 6, Last Exile). However, the project was cancelled in 2006.

Anime films
On January 18, 2010, a website opened up that announced that an anime adaptation would take place. Later, it was confirmed that the Mardock Scramble anime would be turned into a film trilogy. The film trilogy was animated at GoHands studio and produced by Aniplex, directed by Susumu Kudō and the screenplay was written by Ubukata himself. The soundtrack was composed by Conisch.
The first film, The First Compression, was released in Japanese theaters on November 6, 2010. It was also aired on Anime Festival Asia 2010.
The second film, The Second Combustion, was released in to Japanese theaters on September 3, 2011.
The third film, The Third Exhaust, was released in Japanese theaters on September 29, 2012.

Sentai Filmworks has licensed the three films and released The First Compression on DVD on September 27, 2011 followed by a Blu-ray Disc release on March 13, 2012. On the DVD the nudity from the theatrical release has been censored out, the Blu-ray contains both editions of the movie. DVDs of the last two films, The Second Combustion and The Third Exhaust, were released on January 1, 2012 and March 25, 2014 respectively.

Live-action film
On May 30, 2012, it was reported that Dentsu and Hayakawa Publishing licensed the rights to produce a live-action film adaptation of Mardock Scramble and Michael Davis is scheduled to produce and direct the film. However, on May 31, Hayakawa editor Yoshihiro Shiozawa confirmed that the rights of the film are not sold yet and have been in negotiations.

Reception
Mardock Scramble won the Grand Prize of the 24th Nihon SF Taisho Award by the Science Fiction and Fantasy Writers of Japan (SFWJ) in 2003. The novel was nominated for the Grand Prize of the 3rd Sense of Gender Awards in 2004. It was nominated for the Best Japanese Long Work category at the 35th Seiun Awards in 2004.

References

Further reading

External links
  
  at Viz Media
 
 
 

2003 Japanese novels
2010 anime films
2011 anime films
2012 anime films
Anime films based on novels
Aniplex
Cyberpunk anime and manga
Films based on Japanese novels
GoHands
Japanese animated films
Japanese serial novels
Kodansha manga
Sentai Filmworks
Shōnen manga
Viz Media novels